Aciphylla glacialis,  commonly known as snow aciphyll or mountain celery, is a tufted perennial plant that is found in mountainous regions of south-eastern Australia. The species was first formally described in 1855 by Victorian Government Botanist Ferdinand von Mueller as Gingidium glaciale. In 1867 the species was transferred to the genus Aciphylla and given its current name by English botanist George Bentham in Flora Australiensis. It occurs in Victoria and New South Wales.

References

Apioideae
Flora of New South Wales
Flora of Victoria (Australia)
Plants described in 1855
Taxa named by Ferdinand von Mueller